Princess Red Wing, aka Mary E. (Glasko) Congdon, (March 21, 1896–December 2, 1987) was a Narragansett and Wampanoag elder, historian, folklorist, and museum curator. She was an expert on American Indian history and culture, and she once addressed the United Nations.

Biography
"Princess Red Wing" was born Mary E. Glasko on March 21, 1896 in Sprague, Connecticut to Walter and Hannah Glasko (née Weeden). She said that her mother chose to call her Princess Red Wing after the red-winged blackbird "to fling her mission far with grace". Her mother was a Pokanoket and her father was a Narragansett, and she was related to prominent Native Americans such as Simeon Simons, who fought with George Washington, and Metacomet, who is remembered for waging King Philip's War against the colonies in New England in the 1670s.

Red Wing was the co-founder and editor of The Narragansett Dawn tribal newspaper which was published from 1935 to 1936. She became "Squaw Sachem" of the New England Council of Chiefs in 1945, a position which allowed her to preside over sacred ceremonies and festivals. She was also a prominent storyteller in the Narragansett community, keeping alive the oral traditions of her tribe. She preserved their history by founding the Tomaquag Indian Memorial Museum in Rhode Island. From 1947 to 1970, she served as a member of the Speaker's Research Committee of the under secretariat of the United Nations. In 1975, she was awarded an honorary doctorate of human affairs by the University of Rhode Island. In 1978, she was inducted into the Rhode Island Heritage Hall of Fame.

Red Wing was married to Horace Peek until his death in 1927, then to Daniel Congdon from 1936 to his death in 1959. She died on December 2, 1987 at age 91 and was buried in Pascoag, Rhode Island.

References

External links

1896 births
1987 deaths
20th-century Native Americans
20th-century philanthropists
American storytellers
American women historians
Burials in Rhode Island
Historians of Native Americans
Museum founders
Narragansett people
People from Sprague, Connecticut
Wampanoag people
Women storytellers
20th-century American women
20th-century Native American women
Historians from Connecticut
American women curators
American curators